Wayne Kelvin Forrest Brown (born 22 August 1946) is a New Zealand politician and the mayor of Auckland since the 2022 Auckland mayoral election. He has worked in leadership roles in several large New Zealand businesses and public infrastructure organisations.  He was mayor of the Far North District Council from 2007 to 2013. 

Born in Auckland in 1946, Brown studied engineering at the University of Auckland before becoming a property developer in the Bay of Islands. He has also served as a director of TVNZ, Māori TV, Transpower, Vector Ltd, and was once chair of the Land Transport Safety Authority. He entered politics in 2007, winning the mayoralty of the Far North District in a landslide. After criticism for the collusion of his business and personal interests, a third term was denied to him almost as emphatically in 2013. In 2022, Brown launched a campaign for the mayoralty of Auckland, a city he had few business ties to. In the election he gained 45% of the votes cast on a turnout of 35%, compared to the 31% given to the Labour Party's candidate Efeso Collins.  

, Brown is  overseeing the regional response to the 2023 Auckland floods; he was criticised for his lack of action on its first day. He is also known for being uncommonly reluctant to accept interviews, having granted just two from 108 requests within his first month as mayor.

Early life and family
Brown was born in Auckland on 22 August 1946, and was educated at Auckland Grammar School. He went on to study engineering at the University of Auckland from 1964 to 1967, and graduated with a Bachelor of Engineering degree. He then spent several years overseas.

After returning to New Zealand, Brown established an engineering consulting practice in Auckland. In 1974, he married his wife, Toni, and the couple went on to have two children. Two years after marrying, they moved to Kerikeri in the Bay of Islands.

Business career
An engineer by training, Brown is a property developer. He has served as a director of many New Zealand organisations, both public and private. These include TVNZ, Māori TV, Transpower, Vector Ltd, and was chair of the Land Transport Safety Authority. In the 2000s he chaired the Government-owned telecommunications firm Kordia.

In 2019, he led a review for the New Zealand Government which recommended shifting the Port of Auckland to Marsden Point in the country's north. There was some controversy around this idea, with other reports suggesting it would be more expensive or that the port should be shifted to Manukau harbour. In 2020 the government deferred its decision until 2021.

, his business interests include a public bar in Ōtāhuhu (the Milestone Bar), where he is a member of the Business Association, and at least one company directorship and shareholding.

Public service career

District health boards
Brown was appointed chairman of the Northland District Health Board and Tairāwhiti District Health Board in January 2001 when district health boards were established; he had previously chaired the respective Hospital and Health Service (HHS) boards. In December 2001, Brown was appointed to chairman of the Auckland District Health Board and remained chair of Tairāwhiti DHB. During the 2001–2004 local government term, Brown was forced to resign from Tairāwhiti DHB, where he had been elected, due to an administrative error by the Ministry of Health. The underlying legislation, the New Zealand Public Health and Disability Act 2000, did not allow a person elected to a district health board to also be a member of a second board, but this had been overlooked. Brown remained the appointed chair of the Auckland DHB. Brown was reappointed by the Health Minister Annette King for another term in October 2004, but the new Health Minister, David Cunliffe, chose a new chair for Auckland from December 2007, appointing Patrick Snedden. Brown describes his performance as chair of these boards as a successful "fixer". However, several anonymous senior medical staff have been reported to dispute this.

Mayor of the Far North District, 2007–2013
In the October 2007 local elections, Brown challenged the three-term mayor of Far North District, Yvonne Sharp, and had a "landslide victory". Brown received 10,081 votes, almost twice as many as Sharp, from the total Far North population of 55,000. He appointed Sally Macauley as deputy mayor. For the October 2010 local elections, Brown, at 64, delayed announcing his candidacy "just in case someone younger and brighter came forward" to continue his work, but when this did not happen, he put his nomination forward in August. He narrowly defeated John Goulter, and appointed Ann Court as deputy mayor. In the October 2013 local elections, Brown was decisively defeated by John Carter (8521 votes to Brown's 2502), who had represented the area in parliament until 2011.

As mayor, Brown received some criticism in an enquiry by the auditor general for blurring roles and was advised "to separate his personal and official roles more carefully in future". In September 2022, Brown stated that he had "learnt a lesson" and this was unlikely to be a problem in Auckland as most of his current business interests are outside Auckland.

2022 Auckland mayoral campaign
On 29 March, Brown launched his Auckland mayoral campaign at an event hosted by the Avondale Business Association, with a plan to "Fix Auckland". His team included National Party strategist and lobbyist and political commentator Matthew Hooton and National Party-aligned strategist Tim Hurdle. Near the end of his campaign Brown said on camera that if successful he wanted to glue pictures of a certain journalist on urinals so people could "pee on him". This drew widespread criticism in the news media.

In the 2022 Auckland mayoral election, Brown gained 45% of the votes cast on a turnout of 35%, compared to the 31% given to the Labour Party's candidate Efeso Collins. Collins announced his concession immediately through Twitter, giving support and congratulating Brown on his victory. Collins offered Brown his full support but stepped down from local politics, pointing out issues in the current voting system and particularly low voter turnout in South Auckland. As only the third Mayor of the Auckland "super-city", his election marked a change from the previous 12 years of centre-left leadership of the city.

Mayor of Auckland, 2022–present
Following his election as mayor of Auckland, Brown appointed Hooton as his interim head of policy and communications, economic adviser and campaign strategist Tim Hurdle as his interim chief of staff, and Hurdle's wife Jacinda Lean as interim deputy chief of staff. In mid-October 2022, former New Zealand First Member of Parliament Jenny Marcroft became an adviser to Brown. During his first month as Mayor, Brown called for the heads and board members of several council-controlled organisations including Auckland Transport and the Auckland Council's development arm Eke Panuku to resign as part of a leadership shakeup. Auckland Transport's chair Adrienne Young-Cooper resigned shortly after Brown won the mayoral race. In addition, Brown called on Auckland Transport to prioritise roading and carparking networks. He criticised the council-controlled organisation for using transport policy and services as a tool for changing how Aucklanders lived.

Three Waters
During his mayoral election campaign, Brown had campaigned on stopping the Three Waters reform programme, and on 17 October, Brown instructed Auckland's water management company Watercare to stop working on the programme, describing it as a "doomed proposal". On 31 October 2022, Brown along with the Mayor of Christchurch Phil Mauger and the Mayor of Waimakariri Dan Gordon proposed an alternative Three Waters plan. Key provisions include retaining the national water regulator Taumata Arowai while preserving local ownership over water resources and infrastructure. Other proposed changes have included providing affordable finance to support investments in water infrastructure and encouraging local water services entities to merge into regional water entities.

2023 Auckland floods 
, Brown is overseeing the regional reaction to the 2023 Auckland floods, for which he did not declare a state of emergency for twelve hours after flooding began. He was  widely criticised for his slow early response to the unprecedented deluge. When questioned on the poor level of preparedness on RNZ by Kim Hill, in a rare public interview, (he has granted just two during the first month of his mayoralty out of 108 requests), he was unable to confirm whether or not text alerts had been sent out to Aucklanders or if tap water was safe to consume, and claimed it was "a bit early" and "not helpful" to ask if the floods were caused by climate change. Hill clarified to Brown that no texts had been sent. When she said that his administration's "level of inability to cope was terrifying", he then claimed it "will be interesting to see just how well prepared Wellington is when the earthquake strikes." Wellington as a city is extremely vulnerable to earthquakes; this prompted condemnation for his mocking remarks. Hill challenged him for what she described as "a low blow under the circumstances.". Due to the lack of response from Wayne Brown during the first day of the 2023 Auckland floods, the opposition is rising against him; including a well signed petition on Change.org.

See also
 List of chairpersons of district health boards

References 

1946 births
Living people
Businesspeople from Auckland
People educated at Auckland Grammar School
University of Auckland alumni
New Zealand civil engineers
Auckland District Health Board members
Tairāwhiti District Health Board members
Northland District Health Board members
Mayors of places in the Northland Region
Mayors of Auckland
21st-century New Zealand politicians